Charles Nelson Corey Jr. (June 4, 1915 – August 10, 2013) was an American football coach. He served as the head football coach at Colby College in Waterville, Maine in 1951 and at Bowdoin College in Brunswick, Maine from 1959 to 1964.

References

External links
 

1915 births
2013 deaths
Colby Mules football coaches
Bowdoin Polar Bears football coaches
People from Newburyport, Massachusetts
Sportspeople from Essex County, Massachusetts